Robert Finnerty (born 1998) is a Gaelic footballer who plays for Salthill-Knocknacarra and at senior level for the Galway county team.

Part of the Galway senior panel since 2017, he played for Galway in the 2016 All-Ireland Minor Football Championship final and the 2017 All-Ireland Under-21 Football Championship final. He has played Sigerson Cup football for NUI Galway and is the son of Anthony Finnerty, who played for Mayo.

Robert Finnerty made senior championship appearances for Galway in 2019, playing championship before he played in the league.

He scored a goal in Pádraic Joyce's first game as manager.

He took a penalty against Armagh in the 2022 All-Ireland SFC quarter-final game.

Honours
Galway
 Connacht Senior Football Championship: 2022

References

Living people
Galway inter-county Gaelic footballers
University of Galway Gaelic footballers
Salthill-Knocknacarra Gaelic footballers
1998 births